Ray Charles Greatest Hits is a 1962 album by Ray Charles. Although many similarly titled albums would be released over the years, this was the first, and it contained many tracks previously released by ABC only as singles.

The album is included in Robert Christgau's "Basic Record Library" of 1950s and 1960s recordings, published in Christgau's Record Guide: Rock Albums of the Seventies (1981).

Track listing
Side A:
"Them That Got" (Ricci Harper) – 2:47
"Georgia on My Mind" (Carmichael, Gorrell) – 3:37
"Unchain My Heart" (Sharp) – 2:52
"I'm Gonna Move to the Outskirts of Town" (Weldon) – 3:38
"The Danger Zone" (Mayfield) – 2:22
"I've Got News for You" (Alfred) – 4:28
Side B:
"Hit the Road Jack" (Mayfield) – 2:00
"Ruby" (Roemheld, Parish) – 3:51
"I Wonder" (Gant, Leveen) – 2:30
"Sticks and Stones" (Titus Turner) – 2:14
"But on the Other Hand Baby" (Mayfield, Charles) – 3:11
"One Mint Julep" (Toombs) – 3:02

Notes
A2 was released previously on The Genius Hits the Road.
B2 was released previously on Dedicated to You.
A4, A6, and B6 were released previously on Genius + Soul = Jazz.
A1, A3, A5, B1, B3, B4 and B5 were released only as singles prior to this album.  All above tracks had also been released as singles.

Certifications

References

External links 
Ray Charles Greatest Hits at [ Allmusic.com]

Ray Charles compilation albums
1962 greatest hits albums
ABC Records compilation albums